The Olmsted Brothers company was a landscape architectural firm in the United States, established in 1898 by brothers John Charles Olmsted (1852–1920) and Frederick Law Olmsted Jr. (1870–1957), sons of the landscape architect Frederick Law Olmsted.

History
The Olmsted Brothers inherited the nation's first landscape architecture business from their father Frederick Law Olmsted. This firm was a successor to the earlier firm of Olmsted, Olmsted and Eliot after the death of their partner Charles Eliot in 1897. The two brothers were among the founding members of the American Society of Landscape Architects (ASLA) and played an influential role in creating the National Park Service. Prior to their takeover of the firm, Frederick Law Olmsted Jr. had worked as an apprentice under his father, helping to design projects such as Biltmore Estate and the World's Columbian Exposition before graduating from Harvard University. The firm employed nearly 60 staff at its peak in the early 1930s. Notable landscape architects in the firm included James Frederick Dawson and Percival Gallagher.  The last Olmsted family member in the firm, Frederick Law Olmsted Jr., retired in 1949. The firm itself remained in operation, moving from  Brookline in 1980 and continuing in Fremont, New Hampshire until 2000. This created one continuous firm from 1858–2000.

Office and archives
It offers excellent insights into the practice of large-scale landscape design and engineering. The site also houses an archive (access by appointment only) of the firm's designs, plant lists, and photos for hundreds of projects.

Design work
The Olmsted Brothers completed numerous high-profile projects, many of which remain popular to this day, including park systems, universities, exposition grounds, libraries, hospitals, residential neighborhoods and state capitols. Notable commissions include the roadways in the Great Smoky Mountains and Acadia National Parks; Yosemite Valley; Atlanta's Piedmont Park; Springvale Park; Uplands; campuses like Washington University in St. Louis and Emma Willard School; residential neighborhoods in Oak Bay, British Columbia, Canada, and Oakland, California, including the street layout for what is now the Lakeshore Homes Association (the oldest homeowners' association west of the Mississippi River and which includes parts of Oakland's historic Crocker Highlands and Trestle Glen neighborhoods); entire park systems in cities such as Cleveland, Portland, Seattle; and Washington state's Northern State Hospital. The Olmsted Brothers also co-authored, with Harland Bartholomew, a 1930 report for the Los Angeles Chamber of Commerce entitled "Parks, Playgrounds, and Beaches for the Los Angeles Region" encouraging the preservation of outdoor public space in southern California. The report was largely ignored by the city, but became an important urban planning reference. In addition to these higher profile projects, the Olmsted Brothers took on projects beautifying residential areas.

See also
 List of Olmsted works

References

External links

 Olmsted His Essential Theory
 Olmsted Parks in Seattle -- A Snapshot History at HistoryLink.org
  	Olmsted Associates: A Register of Its Records in the Library of Congress, Manuscript Division
 Olmsted Research Guide Online a search tool for Olmsted projects and archival records
 Frederick Law Olmsted National Historic Site preserved home, office and archives of Olmsted firm, National Park Service
 National Association for Olmsted Parks
 Filson Historical Society|accessdate=15 April 2015 In the Filson Archives: Olmsted Brothers (landscape designers), 420, 580, 848.

American landscape architects
Landscape architecture
Landscape
Cultural landscapes
Companies based in Massachusetts
1898 establishments in Massachusetts
Druid Hills, Georgia
1980 disestablishments in Massachusetts
Design companies established in 1898
Design companies disestablished in 1980